The Big War is the second novel of Anton Myrer, published by Appleton-Century-Crofts in 1957. While Myrer is best known for his 1968 novel Once an Eagle, this was his first commercial and critical success.

The ordinary Marine's perception of battle is described in this book in a manner much like Saving Private Ryan or Band of Brothers, although in this work Myrer also gives a detailed description of life on "the home front" for both Marines (during leave) and their families.

Background
It was based on Myer's experience in the war serving in the South Pacific.

Critical reviews 
Clifton Fadiman compared The Big War to The Naked and the Dead. Commonweal compared it to War and Peace and The Red Badge of Courage. The Boston Herald described it as a modern Iliad.

The New York Times called it "almost never exciting".

Adaptations 
This novel became the basis for the 1958 movie In Love and War, starring Robert Wagner Jeffrey Hunter, Bradford Dillman and Hope Lange.

References

Novels set during World War II
Anti-war novels
American war novels
1957 American novels
Appleton-Century-Crofts books
Hamish Hamilton books
American novels adapted into films